The Kochkor Game Reserve is located in Kochkor District of Naryn Region of Kyrgyzstan. It was established in 1977 with a purpose of reproduction of pheasant, tolai hare, and other game animals. The game reserve occupies .

References

Game reserves in Kyrgyzstan
Protected areas established in 1975